The Legendre Flour Mill (in English: Legendre Mill) is located in Stornoway, in Estrie. Built in 1883 by Télésphore Legendre, it is one of the last water mills in Quebec, Canada. He stopped grinding flour around 1940. Another mill existed in the same place before 1883.

Identification 

 Building name: Legendre water mill
 Watercourse:Legendre River
 Municipality:Stornoway
 Private property

History 

The Legendre mill was rebuilt following a fire which destroyed the Legendre family home as well as their carding, fulling and flour mills. The flour mill was rebuilt the same year as well as their other buildings. It is mainly used for local production, which is relatively low given the altitude of the village and the low production capacity of the land. He produced until the 1940s, when it became easier to buy flour than to produce it. The latter survives compared to the other mills, which were demolished in the 1950s. The Legendre mill was cited Historic monument by the municipality of Stornoway on May 5th, 2008 in Quebec.

See also 
 Grain mill

Notes and references

External links 
 Le Moulin Legendre on GrandQuébec.com
 Moulin Legendre
 Virtual tour of the mills of the Eastern Townships

Buildings and structures in Estrie
Le Granit Regional County Municipality
Buildings and structures completed in 1883